The Campeonato Gaúcho Segunda Divisão, commonly known as Campeonato Gaúcho Série B, is the third-highest professional football league in the Brazilian state of Rio Grande do Sul. The league is contested between 10 clubs and typically lasts in the first half of the year.

Format
There are 10 clubs in the Campeonato Gaúcho Série B, divided into two groups. During the course of a first phase (from March to June), each team will face the other teams of their group in roundtrip. Teams receive three points for a win and one point for a draw. No points are awarded for a loss. Teams are ranked by total points, then wins, goal difference and goals scored. The top four teams from each group qualified to the next phase. At this stage, all eight clubs face off in round home and away. The top two clubs qualify for the finals. The winner is promoted to the Série A2.

Clubs

2022 Série B

List of champions

Notes

Ulbra is the currently Canoas SC.
Lami changed their name to Porto Alegre FC.
RS Futebol changed their name to Pedrabanca FC.

Titles by team

Teams in bold stills active.

By city

See also
Campeonato Gaúcho
Campeonato Gaúcho Série A2

References

External links
FGF website. Federação Gaúcha de Futebol.